The finals and the qualifying heats of the men's 400 metre individual medley event at the 1998 World Aquatics Championships were held on Tuesday 13 January 1998 in Perth, Western Australia.

A Final

B Final

Qualifying heats

See also
1996 Men's Olympic Games 400m Individual Medley (Atlanta)
1997 Men's World SC Championships 400m Individual Medley (Gothenburg)
1997 Men's European LC Championships 400m Individual Medley (Seville)
2000 Men's Olympic Games 400m Individual Medley (Sydney)

References

Swimming at the 1998 World Aquatics Championships